Ripplebrook is a locality in the Shire of Baw Baw. As of the 2016 Australian Census, Ripplebrook has a population of 221.

Ripplebrook is mainly farmland used for horse agistment and stud farms. It has a primary school and a Bed & Breakfast Ripplebrook Cottages.

References

Towns in Victoria (Australia)
Shire of Baw Baw